Chkmeruli is a traditional Georgian dish of chicken in garlic sauce.

Preparation 
Both sides of the chicken are fried and then is cooked over low heat for 20–25 minutes in the covered pan. When the chicken is done, it is placed in a plate and a little oil from the pan is added; garlic and nuts are simmered along with water in the remaining oil. After 5 minutes, the chicken is added to this mixture and heated before serving.

See also 

 Georgian cuisine
 List of chicken dishes

References

Cuisine of Georgia (country)